Marcin Matkowski and Leander Paes were the defending champions, but Matkowski chose not to participate. Paes played alongside Grigor Dimitrov, but lost in the first round to Rameez Junaid and Jonathan Marray.
Treat Huey and Henri Kontinen won the title, defeating Raven Klaasen and Rajeev Ram in the final, 7–6(7–4), 6–2.

Seeds

Draw

Draw

References
 Main Draw

Malaysian Open, Kuala Lumpur - Doubles
2015 Doubles